The Orthodox Christian Laity (OCL) is an independently organized movement of Orthodox Christian laity and clergy who are "involved with Orthodox Renewal in the Americas." Today, the Orthodox Church shows signs of a growing complexity of problems and concerns that include internal stresses and external attacks of a secular society. It serves as an advocate for unity between clergy and laity and to inform the Orthodox faithful by providing awareness through its various educational ministries.

The organization's patron saints are Ss. Photini the Samaritan woman and Symeon the New Theologian.

See also
Autonomy
Autocephaly

Sources
Orthodox Christian Laity: Questions and Answers

External links
Orthodox Christian Laity (official site)

Eastern Orthodox organizations
Eastern Orthodoxy in North America